Château Doisy may refer to several Bordeaux wine producer of Sauternes:

Château Doisy Daëne
Château Doisy-Dubroca
Château Doisy-Védrines